"The Suite Life Goes Hollywood" is an hour-long episode of The Suite Life of Zack & Cody. It was presented in two parts and premiered on April 20, 2007, with two encores on April 21 and April 22.

Plot summary
On a winter day when school is closed, Zack and Cody cause mischief in the hotel. Two failing screenwriters notice their antics and think it might make a good television show, so the boys, their mother, Maddie, London, and Mr. Moseby fly to Hollywood to consult with the writers and observe the pilot of the show, titled How Suite It Is. They stay at the Tipton in Los Angeles, which is largely identical to the one in Boston, and they meet the cast of the show: Zack and Cody are portrayed by two young boys, Carey by a young lady, Maddie by a pretty girl who pretends to like her, London by a boy, and Moseby by a tall man who talks with street slang. The producers think that the twins playing Zack and Cody are too young, and it is decided that the real Zack and Cody should play themselves. This is something the twins see as an exciting opportunity. The rest of the group is kicked out during rehearsals for interfering with the process.

After being kicked out of the stage, Maddie and London, who notice a star they like, dress in costumes for the film he is to be in in order to sneak onto the set. The director assumes them to be stunt doubles, which they initially refuse but eventually go along with because they believe are to kiss the star at the end. However, after they have done the stunts, the real actors are the ones to kiss the star, and the true stunt doubles have them removed from the set.

Back at the taping, Cody becomes nervous and forgets his lines when he finds out how many people are in the audience. This annoys Zack, and the two start to fight, resulting in their mother taking them backstage to lecture them. During the lull in the taping, one of the crew people asks the audience if there are any talented people there. The Veronicas, who are in the audience come down to the stage and sing a song, which is well liked by the crew and audience, resulting in Zack and Cody being fired and The Veronicas being hired. The group then head back to Boston the next day.

Note: The interior scenes for the Los Angeles Tipton, as well as the Hollywood set-version for the soundstage was actually filmed on the exact same set that's used to represent the Boston Tipton for the entire series (as the whole series was filmed in Los Angeles).

Cast

Guest cast
 The Veronicas played themselves and performed "Cry".
 Jennifer Kelly Tisdale played Saloon Girl #1; stunt double for Saloon Girl #1 played Maddie Fitzpatrick (Jennifer's sister, Ashley Tisdale). Jennifer Tisdale eventually played a recurring role as Connie, in The Suite Life on Deck.
 Dante Basco played Madrid Tipton (they wanted London to be a boy for the show). 
Benjamin Brown played cast Moseby
Richard Correll played the episode's real-life director, played TV Director
Shawn Crowder as stunt Bell Boy
Louis Dix as Louis
Chris Doyle as Waiter
Mary Z. Othman played cast Maddie
Dina L. Margolin played Maddie stunt double
Sam McMurray played Bud
Eddie Mekka played Western Director
Christopher Neiman played Lou
Michelle Nordin played cast Carey
Brecken Palmer played Zack Martin
Bridger Palmer played Cody Martin
Ming Qiu played London stunt double
Nikki SooHoo played Saloon Girl #2
Josh Sussman played Kid
Lisa Lafaro Weselis played Stunt Old Lady
Richard Whiten played Security Guard 
Merritt Yohnka played Stunt Businessman
Rik Young played Johnny Vaine

Reception
 The Suite Life of Zack & Cody episode was among the top five shows for viewers ages 6 – 11 as of April 27, 2007.
 "The Hub" called The Suite Life Goes Hollywood "Today's Might-See." They felt that some parts are overacted, but that the Maddie and London subplot is good.
 The New York Daily News described The Suite Life Goes Hollywood as "innocent," and as "a two-part adventure."

Footnotes

External links
 "The Suite Life Goes Hollywood" at the Internet Movie Database

2007 American television episodes
The Suite Life of Zack & Cody
The Suite Life of Zack & Cody episodes